Flat Creek is a stream in Ripley County in the U.S. state of Missouri. It is a tributary of the Little Black River.

Flat Creek was so named for the fact the surrounding land is flat.

See also
List of rivers of Missouri

References

Rivers of Ripley County, Missouri
Rivers of Missouri